
A square degree (deg2) is a non-SI unit measure of solid angle. Other denotations include sq. deg. and (°)2. Just as degrees are used to measure parts of a circle, square degrees are used to measure parts of a sphere.

Examples 
The Moon is only a half degree across (i.e. a circular diameter of roughly ), so the moon's disk covers a circular area of:2, or 0.2 square degrees. The moon varies from 0.188 to  depending on its distance to the Earth.
 Viewed from Earth, the Sun is roughly half a degree across (the same as the full moon) and covers only  as well.
 It would take  times the full moon (or the Sun) to cover the entire celestial sphere.
 Conversely, an average full moon (or the Sun) covers a 2 /  fraction, or less than 1/1000 of a percent of the celestial hemisphere, or above-the-horizon sky.

See also 
 Steradian
 Spat (angular unit)
 Minute and second of arc
 List of constellations by area

References

External links 
 

Units of solid angle